Van Dorp may refer to:

Wayne Van Dorp (born 1961), Canadian hockey player
Lizzy van Dorp (1872–1945) Dutch lawyer
Fred van Dorp (born 1938), Dutch water polo player
Tony van Dorp (1936–2010, Dutch-American water polo player, brother of Fred
David Adriaan van Dorp (1915–1995), Dutch chemist
Simon van Dorp (born 1997), Dutch rower

Surnames of Dutch origin